Satish Bhanudasrao Chavan (born 26 January 1962) is an Indian politician from Nationalist Congress Party. He is Member of Legislative Council of Maharashtra. He has served two terms from 2008 to 2020.

Early life
Chavan was born on 26 January 1962 in a Maratha family. His father was a farmer. He completed his B.E. in Mechanical Engineering.

Positions Held

 Member of Maharashtra Legislative Council - 2008 - 2014
 Member of Maharashtra Legislative Council - 2014 - 2020
 Member of Maharashtra Legislative Council - 2020- 2026
 Secretary - Marathwada Shikshan Prasarak Mandal, Aurangabad

References

External links
 Satischavan.in

Nationalist Congress Party politicians from Maharashtra
Members of the Maharashtra Legislative Council
Living people
1962 births
People from Osmanabad district
Marathi politicians